The 2019 VCU Rams baseball team was the program's 49th baseball season. It was their 7th season the Atlantic 10 Conference. The regular season began on February 15, 2019, and concluded on May 18, 2019. The Rams finished as regular season champions.

Preseason

A10 media poll
The A10 media poll was released on February 7, 2019, with the Rams predicted to finish in second place in the Atlantic 10.

Roster

Regular season

Results

Game log

Rankings

References 

Vcu
VCU Rams baseball seasons
VCU Rams baseball
Vcu baseball
Atlantic 10 Conference baseball champion seasons